Roerichiora obliquifascia is a species of moth of the family Cossidae. It is found in Myanmar and India (Assam).

References

Moths described in 1950
Zeuzerinae